Events in the year 1879 in India.

Incumbents
 Empress of India – Queen Victoria
 Viceroy of India – Robert Bulwer-Lytton, 1st Earl of Lytton

Events
 National income - 4,083 million
 The Bombay Dyeing & Mfg. Co. Ltd., a textile company, established

Law
Elephants' Preservation Act
Legal Practitioners Act
Registration Of Births, Deaths and Marriages (Army) Act (British statute)
Indian Guaranteed Railways Act (British statute)
East Indian Railway (Redemption of Annuities) Act (British statute)
East India Loan Act (British statute)

Births
K. N. Sivaraja Pillai (1879–1941) Indian historian, dravidologist and professor (d. 1941).
Sarojini Naidu (1879-1949) Indian political activist and poet
Periyar E.V. Ramasamy (1879-1973) Indian social activist and politician

 
India
Years of the 19th century in India